Boonea bisuturalis (also known as the three-toothed odostome or the two-groove odostome) is a species of minute sea snail, a pyramidellid gastropod mollusk or micromollusk in the family Pyramidellidae, the pyrams and their allies. The species is one of eleven known species within the Boonea genus of gastropods.

This species is  ectoparasitic (an external parasite) on various bivalves and other gastropods. It is notorious as a pest on oyster beds.  Its preferred hosts are the common periwinkle Littorina littorea, the mud snail Tritia obsoleta and the eastern oyster  Crassostrea virginica

Description
The length of the shell varies between 2.8 mm and 5.8 mm. The smooth shell has a light brownish epidermis. The 5-6 whorls of the teleoconch show an impressed revolving line below the suture. The periphery is obtusely angulated.

Distribution
This marine species occurs off Gulf of St Lawrence, Canada, and can exceed distribution throughout marine areas ranging from Canada to the state of Delaware, USA. The species is also notable within the Gulf of Maine.

References

 Totten, J. G. 1834. Description of some new shells, belonging to the coast of New England. American Journal of Science and Arts 26: 366-369, 1 pl.
 Couthouy, J. P. 1838. Descriptions of new species of Mollusca and shells, and remarks on several polypi found in Massachusetts Bay. Boston Journal of Natural History 2: 53-111, pls. 1-3.
 De Kay, J. E. 1843. Mollusca. Zoology of New York 5: [iii] + iv + [iv] + 271 pp., 40 pls
 Bartsch, P. 1909. Pyramidellidae of New England and the adjacent region. Proceedings of the Boston Society of Natural History 34: 67-113, pls. 11-14

External links
 Global Invasive Species Database info
 

Pyramidellidae
Gastropods described in 1822